Earline S. Rogers is a Democratic former member of the Indiana Senate, representing the 3rd District from 1990 through 2016. She earlier served in the Indiana House of Representatives from 1982 through 1990. Rogers is a member of the Indiana Black Legislative Caucus.

References

External links
State Senator Earline Rogers official Indiana State Legislature site

 

Democratic Party Indiana state senators
Democratic Party members of the Indiana House of Representatives
1934 births
Living people
Politicians from Gary, Indiana
Women state legislators in Indiana
African-American state legislators in Indiana
African-American women in politics
21st-century American politicians
21st-century American women politicians
21st-century African-American women
21st-century African-American politicians
20th-century African-American people
20th-century African-American women